Tommy N. Thompson (born October 10, 1948, in Owensboro, Kentucky) is an American politician and a Democratic member of the Kentucky House of Representatives representing District 14 since January 2003.

Education
Thompson earned his bachelor's degree from the University of Florida and his MBA from the Indiana University School of Business.

Elections
2012 Thompson was unopposed for the May 22, 2012 Democratic Primary and won the November 6, 2012 General election with 12,107 votes (58.0%) against Republican nominee Marian Turley.
2002 When District 21 Republican Representative Mark Treesh ran for Kentucky Senate and left the seat open, Thompson was unopposed for the 2002 Democratic Primary and won the November 5, 2002 General election with 7,625 votes (56.6%) against Republican nominee Ray Askins.
2004 Thompson was challenged in the 2004 Democratic Primary, winning with 2,300 votes (72.3%) and won the November 2, 2004 General election with 11,015 votes (55.9%) against Republican nominee Steve Winkler.
2006 Thompson was unopposed for both the 2006 Democratic Primary and the November 7, 2006 General election, winning with 11,493 votes.
2008 Thompson was unopposed for both the 2008 Democratic Primary and the November 4, 2008 General election, winning with 15,410 votes.
2010 Thompson was unopposed for the May 18, 2010 Democratic Primary and won the November 2, 2010 General election with 11,282 votes (67.0%) against Republican nominee Paul Estep.

References

External links
Official page at the Kentucky General Assembly
Campaign site

Tommy Thompson at Ballotpedia
Tommy Thompson at the National Institute on Money in State Politics

1948 births
Living people
Kelley School of Business alumni
Democratic Party members of the Kentucky House of Representatives
Politicians from Owensboro, Kentucky
University of Florida alumni
21st-century American politicians